Daniel Emmanuel Ludueña (born 27 July 1982), also known as El Hachita, is an Argentine former professional footballer.

He is the older brother of footballer Gonzalo Ludueña and the son of former Talleres de Córdoba player Luis Antonio Ludueña.

Career
On July 27, 2013 Ludueña made a 70-yard goal against Tigres that proved to be the game winner in a 2-1 win. He also holds Mexican citizenship.

On 8 July 2016, Talleres de Córdoba reached an agreement with Pumas for a 6-month-loan of Ludueña.

On 16 August 2018, Ludueña retired from professional football.

Honours

Club
Santos Laguna
 Primera División de México: Clausura 2008, Clausura 2012

Individual
Primera División de México Attacking Midfielder of the Tournament: 2004–05, Apertura 2007, Clausura 2008
Liga MX Balón de Oro: Apertura 2007

References

External links

Guardian statistics 
Daniel Ludueña – Argentine Primera statistics at Fútbol XXI  

1982 births
Living people
Footballers from Córdoba, Argentina
Argentine footballers
Argentine expatriate footballers
Argentine people of Quechua descent
Argentine emigrants to Mexico
Naturalized citizens of Mexico
Mexican footballers
Club Atlético River Plate footballers
Santos Laguna footballers
Tecos F.C. footballers
C.F. Pachuca players
Club Universidad Nacional footballers
Talleres de Córdoba footballers
Liga MX players
Argentine Primera División players
Association football midfielders